Le Messager was a French language newspaper, founded in 1880 in Lewiston, Maine. It serving the sizeable Franco-American (Franco-Canadian) population in that city. Le Messager operated from 1880 to 1966.  It was a daily newspaper until the mid 1950s when it became a tri-weekly publication. In the early 1960s it adopted a weekly schedule, published every Thursday.  It was succeeded by the Nouveau Messager in 1966; but the following year, it closed as well for lack of funding.

The newspaper was operated out of 223 Lisbon Street in Lewiston, which became the home of Lewiston Auburn Magazine in September 2011.

See also

 Early Franco-American newspapers

References

French-American culture in Maine
French-language newspapers published in the United States
Lewiston, Maine
Defunct newspapers published in Maine
Non-English-language newspapers published in Maine
Newspapers established in 1880
Publications disestablished in 1966
1880 establishments in Maine
1966 disestablishments in Maine